Lemyra rhodophiloides is a moth in the family Erebidae first described by George Hampson in 1909. It is found in Taiwan and Japan.

The wingspan is 27–40 mm.

References

Moths described in 1909
rhodophiloides